Raymond Barry (born 7 October 1949) is an Australian former wrestler who competed in the 1972 Summer Olympics.

References

External links
 

1949 births
Living people
Olympic wrestlers of Australia
Wrestlers at the 1972 Summer Olympics
Australian male sport wrestlers